A -inch gauge railway is a miniature railway that uses the gauge of . It is mainly used in clubs and as a backyard railway.

Locomotives include steam, electric and diesel types. Most are built to an individual design but some are built from kits.

 Gauge railways are owned by clubs or can be privately owned.

See also
 Live steam
 List of ridable miniature railways

References
 7 1/4 Gauge Society website
 Millerbeck Light Railway

 
Miniature railways by size